Agia Marina is a village located in the Nicosia District of Cyprus, around  west of Nicosia.

References

Communities in Nicosia District